Uranothauma kilimensis is a butterfly in the family Lycaenidae. It is found in Tanzania (Kilimanjaro).

References

Endemic fauna of Tanzania
Butterflies described in 1985
Uranothauma